Maksym Tretyakov (born 6 March 1996) is a Ukrainian football midfielder who plays for Oleksandriya.

Career
Tretyakov is a product of the FC Dnipro School System from age 10.

He spent his career in the Ukrainian Premier League Reserves club FC Dnipro. In February 2016 Tretyakov went on loan in FC Metalist and was promoted to the Ukrainian Premier League's squad. He made his debut for Metalist Kharkiv in the Ukrainian Premier League in a match against FC Volyn Lutsk on 6 March 2016.

References

External links

1996 births
Living people
Ukrainian footballers
Ukrainian expatriate footballers
FC Metalist Kharkiv players
Ukrainian Premier League players
FC Dnipro players
FC Chornomorets Odesa players
FC DAC 1904 Dunajská Streda players
Slovak Super Liga players
FC Oleksandriya players
Expatriate footballers in Slovakia
Ukrainian expatriate sportspeople in Slovakia
Association football midfielders
Sportspeople from Mykolaiv Oblast